The following is a list of episodes for the NBC crime drama series Third Watch. The series premiered on September 26, 1999, and the final episode aired on May 6, 2005. A total of 132 episodes were produced over six seasons.

Series overview

Episodes

Season 1 (1999–2000)

Season 2 (2000–01)

Season 3 (2001–02)

Season 4 (2002–03)

Season 5 (2003–04)

Season 6 (2004–05)

References

External links
 

Lists of American crime television series episodes